Seyed Ali Akbar Heidari (born 14 July 1941) is a retired Iranian flyweight freestyle wrestler. He won a bronze medal at the 1964 Olympics, a silver medal at the 1966 Asian Games, and placed fourth at the 1965 World Championships.

References

Olympic wrestlers of Iran
Wrestlers at the 1964 Summer Olympics
Iranian male sport wrestlers
Olympic bronze medalists for Iran
Living people
1941 births
Asian Games silver medalists for Iran
Olympic medalists in wrestling
Asian Games medalists in wrestling
Wrestlers at the 1966 Asian Games
Medalists at the 1966 Asian Games
Medalists at the 1964 Summer Olympics
20th-century Iranian people
21st-century Iranian people